Huaytará District is one of sixteen districts in Huaytará Province, Peru. Its seat is Huaytará.

See also
 Inka Wasi
 Runayuq

References